Cape Kater is a cape fringed by rocks, forming the northwestern extremity of Whittle Peninsula on the west coast of Graham Land. This coast was sketched by a British expedition 1828–31, under Henry Foster, who named a cape in this region after Captain Henry Kater, a member of the committee which planned the expedition. This region was more fully mapped by the Swedish Antarctic Expedition, 1901–04, under Otto Nordenskjold, who gave the name "Cape Gunnar" to this cape. The name Kater perpetuates the earlier naming.

See also
Kater Rocks, cluster of rocks 1 nautical mile (2 km) northwest of Cape Kater

References

External links

Headlands of Graham Land
Davis Coast